Inter-Services Public Relations of Pakistan produced many media productions. Since the 1990s, the ISPR has been producing dramas, songs, films on military fiction, games and military reality shows. The drama Alpha Bravo Charlie was a hit drama by ISPR during the late 1990s. This is a list of songs, shows, games, films and dramas produced by ISPR.

Documentary films

Dramas

Games

Reality shows

Songs 
This is a list of ISPR songs with their release year and singer.

Telefilms

References 

Inter-Services Public Relations
 
Inter-Services Public Relations films
Inter-Services Public Relations dramas